Boneyfiddle Commercial District is a neighborhood and historic district in Portsmouth, Ohio, United States. Also known as the Historic Boneyfiddle District, it is located at the confluence of the Scioto and Ohio rivers on Second Street and is bounded roughly by Front, Washington, 3rd and Scioto streets. The community was founded by German immigrants in the mid-19th century and was developed during the booming industrial economy of the late 19th and early 20th centuries.

On June 6, 1979, the Boneyfiddle Commercial District was added to the National Register of Historic Places.

See also
 National Register of Historic Places listings in Scioto County, Ohio

References

External links 
 Historic Boneyfiddle District website
 

Neighborhoods in Ohio
Commercial buildings on the National Register of Historic Places in Ohio
National Register of Historic Places in Scioto County, Ohio
Federal architecture in Ohio
Greek Revival architecture in Ohio
Italianate architecture in Ohio
Historic districts on the National Register of Historic Places in Ohio
German-American culture in Ohio
Portsmouth, Ohio